The 1946–47 IHL season was the second season of the International Hockey League, a North American minor professional league. Five teams participated in the regular season, and the Windsor Spitfires won the Turner Cup.

Regular season

Turner Cup-Playoffs

External links
 Season 1946/47 on hockeydb.com 

IHL
IHL
International Hockey League (1945–2001) seasons